Sebastian Nowak (born January 13, 1982) is a retired Polish footballer who played as a goalkeeper. He is currently working for Stal Rzeszów as a youth goalkeeper coach.

Career

Club
After his current contract expires on 1 January 2008, he will transfer to Górnik Zabrze. He was released from Górnik Zabrze on 1 July 2011.

In July 2011, he joined LKS Nieciecza on a two-year contract.

Coaching career
Nowak joined Stal Rzeszów in the beginning of January 2019. He was hired to coach the youth goalkeepers under 21 at the club, but was also in position to play for the first team if it became necessary.

References

External links
 

1982 births
Association football goalkeepers
Ruch Chorzów players
Górnik Zabrze players
Bruk-Bet Termalica Nieciecza players
GKS Katowice players
Ekstraklasa players
Living people
Polish footballers
People from Jastrzębie-Zdrój
Sportspeople from Silesian Voivodeship